United Nations Security Council Resolution 2624, adopted on 28 February 2022, extended for one year arms embargo on Yemen and sanctions including travel ban and asset freeze against those destabilizing the stability of the country. The security council also extended the mandate of the Panel of Experts on Yemen. 

Eleven members of the Council voted in favor, while Brazil, Ireland, Mexico and Norway abstained.

See also 

 List of United Nations Security Council Resolutions 2601 to 2700

References

External links 

 Resolution 2624 undocs.org

 2624
 2624
2022 in Yemen
February 2022 events